The University of Hertfordshire (UH) is a public university in Hertfordshire, United Kingdom. The university is based largely in Hatfield, Hertfordshire. Its antecedent institution, Hatfield Technical College, was founded in 1948 and was identified as one of 25 Colleges of Technology in the United Kingdom in 1959. In 1992, Hatfield Polytechnic was granted university status by the British government and subsequently renamed University of Hertfordshire. It is one of the post-1992 universities.

Hertfordshire is mainly based at two campuses - College Lane and de Havilland. The university has 9 schools: Hertfordshire Business School, Computer Science, Creative Arts, Education, Health and Social Work, Humanities (which oversees its CATS programme), Hertfordshire Law School, Life and Medical Sciences, Physics, Engineering and Computer Science and Hertfordshire Higher Education Consortium.

As of 2022, it has around 32,000 students, including more than 13,000 international students that together represent 100 countries, making the university host the highest proportion of international students (outside of London) in England. The university is one of Hertfordshire's largest employers with over 3,400 staff, 2,045 of whom are academic members of staff. The annual income of the institution for 2021–22 was £317.5 million of which £9 million was from research grants and contracts, with an expenditure of £305.3 million.  Hertfordshire is a member of University Alliance, Universities UK and European University Association.

History

Origins 

The original campus for the university was at Roe Green in Hatfield, where it was founded as a technical college with a particular focus on training aerospace engineers for the aerospace industry that was then prevalent in Hatfield.  The Gape family of St Michael's Manor in St Albans owned the land at Roe Green from the late 17th century.  In the 1920s they sold it to Hill, a farmer, who then sold it to Alan Butler, chairman of the de Havilland Aircraft Company who lived at Beech Farm nearby. In 1944 he donated  of land at Roe Green to be used for educational purposes. In 1948 building commenced. The first principal W.A.J Chapman started on 1 January 1949 and in spring 1952 the 33 full-time and 66 part-time teachers were appointed. Hatfield Technical College opened with 1,738 students in September 1952 and in December officially opened by Prince Philip, Duke of Edinburgh. It was the first large technical college to be established in England after the war. Students attended the college on part-time or full-time courses.

In 1958 it was renamed Hatfield College of Technology and by 1960 offered four-year sandwich diplomas in technology. In 1961 it was designated a regional college in England and Wales by the Ministry of Education. The governors purchased a digital computer at a cost of £29,201 in 1962 so that a computer science degree could be established. The Council for National Academic Awards was formed in 1965 and Hatfield College was recognised for 13 honours degree courses.

Sir Norman Lindop became the Principal of the College of Technology in 1966. A year later L.E. Haines was made Chair of Governors, but died shortly afterwards and was replaced by F. Bramston Austin. A year later, Bayfordbury is acquired for the college.

20th century 

In 1969 Hatfield College of Technology became Hatfield Polytechnic, offering honours degree courses in engineering and technology. In 1970 an observatory was built on the Bayfordbury Campus. Wall Hall and Balls Park Teacher Training Colleges merged in 1976 to become Hertfordshire College of Higher Education. In the same year Hatfield Polytechnic took over Balls Park. By 1977 more than ten per cent of the 4000 came from more than forty different countries. The Students' Union Social Centre opened in 1977.

In 1982 John Illston succeeded Sir Norman Lindop as the director. A sports hall was built on the Hatfield Campus in 1984 and the number of students in that year was more than 5000. The number of staff, in the same year, had increased to 824.

Neil Buxton became its director in 1987. The following year, Sir Ron Dearing and Buxton signed an agreement that gave the polytechnic accreditation from the Council for National Academic Awards. Hatfield was one of only 21 polytechnics, colleges and Scottish Central institutions to be accredited at the time. Hatfield was also, in that year, one of eight polytechnics accredited for research degrees. In 1989 it was given corporate status.

After John Major announced in 1991 that polytechnics were to be abolished, Hatfield Polytechnic announced its intention to apply for university status. In 1992 it became the University of Hertfordshire and Sir Brian Corby became the first Chancellor. It was the first university to run a bus company by making Uno bus public. The Hertfordshire College of Health Care and Nursing Studies and the Barnet College of Nursing and Midwifery merged with the university in 1993.

In 1992, Hatfield Polytechnic was granted university status by the British government and subsequently renamed University of Hertfordshire. Its antecedent institution, Hatfield Technical College, was founded in 1948 and was identified as one of 25 Colleges of Technology in the United Kingdom in 1959.

In 1994 the St Albans Cathedral was chosen to hold the university's graduation ceremonies. The same year saw the first publication of league tables and Hertfordshire was named as the top new university. In 1995 its law school moved to St Albans. Sir Ian MacLaurin was appointed chancellor in 1996 and in 1997 the Learning Resource Centre opened.

21st century 
In 2000, Olivia de Havilland, cousin of Sir Geoffrey de Havilland, visited the university to mark the inauguration of a project to build a new campus named after her cousin. The university's 50th anniversary was celebrated in 2002, by which time it had 21,695 students. In 2003 Tim Wilson succeeded Neil Buxton as vice-chancellor and the de Havilland campus opened.

Hertfordshire Sports Village also opened in 2003. In 2005 the university launched the Bedfordshire and Hertfordshire Postgraduate Medical School and School of Pharmacy to enhance medical education, training and research in the region. In 2006 the university opened its School of Film, Music and Media. The university opened the MacLaurin building in 2007, named in honour of its former chancellor Lord MacLaurin followed by a new law building in 2011. During this period, Hertfordshire became a lead academic sponsor of Elstree University Technical College, a university technical college which opened in September 2013. Hertfordshire is also the academic sponsor of Watford University Technical College

In 2010, Tim Wilson announced his intention to retire as vice-chancellor after more than 19 years at the university.

In 2011, Quintin McKellar replaced Tim Wilson as vice-chancellor of the university. Also on the same year, the Hatfield Beacon is restored and repositioned at the new Law School site. Meanwhile, in the following year, the Kaspar project received a £180,000 donation from an international grant making foundation, which was used to further the university's research into the use of robotics to support the social development of children with autism.

In 2015, Hertfordshire has adopted a policy of naming its buildings after people or organisations with a significant local or regional impact. These include Kate Bellingham, British engineer and television presenter and Alistair Spalding, chief executive and artistic director of Sadler's Wells Theatre.  All of the halls are being named after influential alumni who the university feels represent the attributes of Hertfordshire graduates. In these two cases, the halls were named in recognition of Bellingham and Spalding's attributes of, intellectual depth and adaptability and professionalism, employability and enterprise. On the same year, University of Hertfordshire has been announced as one of the first recipients of the Race Equality Charter which is an initiative that recognises excellence in advancing racial equality in higher education. The charter was launched by the Equality Challenge Unit at the start of the 2015 academic year.

In 2020, the University of Hertfordshire Observatory celebrated its 50th anniversary, and revealed an eight-year-long exposure photograph, breaking the record of longest exposure. The artist, Regina Valkenborgh, was a Master's student in August 2012, when she set the pinhole camera attached to one of the telescope domes in the Observatory. The camera was then forgotten, and rediscovered in September 2020 by the Observatory's Principal Technical officer. The photograph registered the path of the sun over the sky during the 2,953 days it was exposed to it.

Organisation and administration 

The University of Hertfordshire was established as an independent Higher Education Corporation in 1989 under the terms of the Education Reform Act (1989). The institution is an exempt charity. The board of governors has responsibility for running the university, while the academic board is responsible for academic quality and standards, academic policies, research and scholarship. The vice-chancellor oversees its day-to-day running. The current chancellor is Robert Gascoyne-Cecil and the current vice-chancellor is Quintin McKellar.  In October 2019, the current deputy vice-chancellor,  Professor Ian Campbell, is leaving to become vice-chancellor of Liverpool John Moores University.

The following people have been vice-chancellors of the university.
 Neil Buxton (1987-2003)
 Tim Wilson (2003–2010)
Quintin McKellar (2011–present)

The university runs on a three-term calendar in which the academic year is divided into three terms: Autumn (September–December), Spring (January–April), and Summer(April–May). Full-time undergraduate students take three to four courses every year for approximately eleven weeks before their quarterly academic breaks. The school year typically begins in late September and ends in mid-May.

Schools 
The university offers over 800 undergraduate, postgraduate, CPD, online distance learning and short courses in its 9 schools of study, within which there are around 50 academic departments and 24 research centres.
 Hertfordshire Business School
 Creative Arts
 Education
 Health and Social Work
 Hertfordshire Higher Education Consortium
 Hertfordshire Law School
 Humanities (which oversees its CATS programme)
 Life and Medical Sciences
 Physics, Engineering and Computer Science

Charity 
Being a Higher Education Corporation created by the 1988 Education Reform Act as amended by the 1992 Act, the University of Hertfordshire is an exempt charity as defined under the various Charities Acts.

The University of Hertfordshire has due regard to the Charity Commission's guidance on the reporting of public benefit, and particularly its supplementary guidance on the advancement of education, in accordance with the requirements of HEFCE, the Higher Education Funding Council for England, as the principal regulator of English higher education institutions under the Charities Act 2006.

The university has entered an agreement with the Office of Fair Access (OFFA) to demonstrate that access to programmes of full-time undergraduate education should not be limited on grounds of individual financial circumstances.

Affiliations and memberships 
Hertfordshire is a member of Association of Commonwealth Universities which is the representative body of 535 universities from 37 Commonwealth countries. It is the world's first and oldest international university network, established in 1913. It is also a member of University Alliance, a network of British universities which was formed in 2006, adopting the name in 2007. University Alliance is a group of 'business engaged' universities that claim to drive innovation and enterprise growth through research and teaching. Its MBA programme is affiliated with Association of MBAs, the only global MBA-specific Accreditation and Membership Organisation.

Campus 
The university is primarily based on two campuses, College Lane and de Havilland. It owns a BioPark facility, which is a science park managed by Exemplas on behalf of the university. It also provides 6,000 square metres of laboratory and office space to life science and health technology businesses. As of 2014, there are currently 27 permanent and virtual tenants.

Additionally, a pool and climbing wall are among its sports facilities. It has also the Weston auditorium, for arts events, two art galleries and owns one of the highly recognised teaching observatories in the United Kingdom.

With over 25,130 students, including more than 5,200 international students that together represent 100 countries, Hertfordshire has a global alumni of over 165,000.

College Lane Campus 
The main site of the university remains the College Lane campus, which houses the original Hatfield Technical College building. Notable among the buildings in this campus is the university's Learning Resource Centre, a combined library and computer centre. There is also a substantial collection of halls of residence and student houses, and the University of Hertfordshire Students' Union is headquartered at College Lane campus. The College Lane campus is also the location of Hertfordshire International College, which is part of the Navitas group, providing a direct pathway for international students to the university. The Hertfordshire Intensive Care & Emergency Simulation Centre is also located at College Lane. A new science building has recently opened at College Lane. This purpose built facility will primarily offer teaching laboratories, a range of research laboratories and a café.

de Havilland Campus 
The £120-million de Havilland campus, which was built by Carillion, opened in September 2003 and is situated within 15 minutes walk of College Lane, and is built on a former British Aerospace site. This campus also houses its own Learning Resource Centre, a combined library and computer centre. Hertfordshire Sports Village which includes a gym, swimming pool, squash courts is also on this site. The large Weston Auditiorium is present on the de Havilland campus, adjacent to the Learn Resource Centre. The auditorium has a capacity of 450 and can host talks both by university lectures for students and for guest lecturers for guests and students, music and films events and dance events. The campus also contains 11 halls of residence; named after local towns and villages. Ashwell and Welwyn are examples of the buildings with the towns being present in Hertfordshire. The campus is mostly themed around law and business, having its business school located on the campus as well as its law school. A full scale, mocked up court room is present, being available for use for students studying a law degree. Along with publicly Northampton University it provides the 2 years accelerated law degree.

Bayfordbury Campus 
A third 50-hectare site in Bayfordbury houses the university's astronomical and atmospheric physics remote sensing observatory, Regional Science Learning Centre, field stations for biology and geography programmes.

The observatory has formed part of the astronomy-related degree programmes since it opened in 1970.

The seven optical telescopes at Bayfordbury campus to observe detailed images of objects in space. Moreover, the five newest telescopes are also able to be operated remotely. The 4.5-metre radio telescope and 3-dish 115-metre baseline interferometer allow a completely different view of the universe. These are connected to 21 cm line receivers, to detect the neutral hydrogen in the galaxy and extragalactic radio sources.

Meridian House 
Home to some Schools within the Health and Human Faculty, this building is located on the edge of Hatfield town centre, off College Lane campus. Meridian House is the location of eight clinical skills laboratories for nursing and midwifery programmes of the university. Skills facilities and ambulances for paramedic training are also situated at Meridian House, aside from counselling programme and staff offices.

Gallery

University symbols

Academic dress 
The University of Hertfordshire prescribes academic dress for its members. In accordance with tradition, Hertfordshire's academic dress consists of a gown, a cap and a hood. The black gown and square cap familiar to all readers of the Beano had evolved into their present form in England by the end of the Reformation. The hood, which is now the distinctive mark of a university-level qualification, is medieval in origin, and was originally functional.

Ceremonial mace 
The ceremonial mace was produced in 1999 by craftsman Martyn Pugh, a Freeman of the Worshipful Company of Goldsmiths, member of the British Jewellers Association and a Founder Member of the Association of British Designer Silversmiths. Its design symbolises the university's origins, expertise and associations. Its shape is inspired by the shape of an aeroplane wing symbolising the university's origin in the aviation industry. The head of the mace is engraved with zodiac symbols representing the university's contribution to astronomy and also contains the DNA double helix representing the biological sciences and microprocessor chips representing information and communications technology.

Coat of arms 
The university's coat of arms was granted in 1992. The shield is charged with an oak tree taken from the coat of arms of the former Hatfield Rural District, the constellation Perseus (containing the binary star Algol) and a representation of the letter "H" recalling the emblem of the former Hatfield Polytechnic. The crest, a Phoenix rising from an astral crown, represents the university's evolution from a technical college training apprentices for the aviation industry. The two harts supporting the shield represent the county of Hertfordshire, with the covered cups referring to A.S. Butler, who donated the land upon which the original campus was built. A scroll bears the motto Seek Knowledge Throughout Life.

University logo 
The standard university logo comprises the university name and the UH symbol in a horizontal panel. There is an exclusion zone equivalent to the height of the H in the logo above, below and to the right of the logo. The university have created an endorsed version of the logo to be used where legibility is an issue with the standard logo. It comprises just the university name in a horizontal panel. Although the university brands its logo in various colours, the standard colours are black and white.

Academic profile

Reputation 

The university's School of Pharmacy has been awarded full Royal Pharmaceutical Society of Great Britain accreditation. The University of Hertfordshire is recognised as one of the top twenty universities in the world to study animation.

According to Destination of Leavers from Higher Education 2012–13 93.2 per cent of its full-time, first degree UK graduates are in work or further study within six months of graduating. Four of the university's schools achieved scores of 98 per cent: physics; astronomy and mathematics; health and social work; law and education. The survey, conducted by the UK's Higher Education Statistics Agency (HESA), revealed in its UK Performance Indicators for Employment 2013/14 that the University of Hertfordshire has climbed 30 places in the past year and is now ranked 35th out of 152 universities in the UK.

In September 2015, the Complete University Guide showed that the university has the lowest recorded 'student-relevant' crimes in the East of England.  It is the fourth year the university has had the lowest rate of recorded crime in the East of England. For university's commitment to gender equality, it was regranted Athena Swan's Bronze institutional status.

The University of Hertfordshire won the Guardian University Award for Student Experience in 2015.

Rankings 

University of Hertfordshire ranks 601–800 among world universities in Times Higher Education World University Rankings in 2019. It comes under the ranking of 101-150 under Young University Rankings 2018. In subject specific rankings, it has an overall world ranking between 301 and 400 in Arts and Humanities in 2019. It had a subject specific world ranking between 150 and 200 in European Teaching in 2018.

The Complete University Guide ranked UH courses in Food Science, Social Work, Optometry Ophthalmology & Orthoptics and Medical Technology as the top 20 in the UK in 2019.

In the THE 100 Under 50 universities 2015, a global ranking of the top 100 world universities under 50 years old, University of Hertfordshire was placed 71st.

It was awarded the  Entrepreneurial University of the Year by Times Higher Education in 2010. In 2011, it was ranked 41st by The Complete University Guide among UK universities, its highest regional ranking in recent years.

In the Times Higher Education ranking of most international universities in January 2015, Hertfordshire ranked 84th in the top 100 in the world. In 2016, it was placed at 122nd in the top 200 international universities in the world, by Times Higher Education. The rankings are based on excellence across teaching, research, citations, industry income and international outlook.

In the US News Best Global Universities Ranking in 2018, Hertfordshire ranked 698th among universities in the world.

According to the Times Higher Education Student Experience Survey 2018, the University of Hertfordshire has a ranking of 69, with a score of 75.5 for overall student satisfaction.

QAA and OIA 
The last Quality Assurance Agency institutional audit for the university was in March 2009. The outcome was that 'confidence can reasonably be placed in the soundness of the institution's present and likely future management of the academic standards of the awards that it offers'.

According to the complaint statistics, from the Office of the Independent Adjudicator, the university issued 69 completion of
procedures letters in relation to student complaints, in 2013. This is below the band medium of 81, possibly suggesting greater student
satisfaction when compared to universities of a similar size.
The OIA received 22 complaints in 2013. This is above the band medium of 18.5, possibly suggesting that more students
are dissatisfied with the outcome of internal complaints procedure's, compared to universities of a similar size.

The university has also never been named in an OIA annual report for a shortfall in practice, or a failure to comply with a recommendation set by the Adjudicator.

Research 

The university has three research institutes: Health and Human Sciences Research Institute; Science and Technology Research Institute; Social Sciences, Arts and Humanities Research Institute. Also an expanding research profile with key strengths in areas of nursing, psychology, history, philosophy, physics and computer science.

HR Excellence in Research 
In recognition of development activities related to research careers and the position of researchers at the university, the European Commission awarded University of Hertfordshire the right to use the HR Excellence in Research logo in spring 2010.

Research Excellence Framework 
Over 55 per cent of the university's research has been rated 'world leading' and 'internationally excellent' in the UK Government's 2014 Research Excellence Framework (REF) announced last 18 December 2014. Fifty-seven per cent of the university's research submissions achieved a 4 or 3-star rating. This is an increase of 11% when compared to the results of the assessment in 2008. In 2014, it claimed the top impact for History for the results of REF, indicating that all of its submission in History is deemed 'outstanding'.

Kaspar 

Kaspar, a social robot, has been designed by the University of Hertfordshire's Adaptive Systems Research Group (ASRG). The Kaspar project began in 2005, drawing upon previous researches to develop a social robot for engaging autistic children in a variety of play scenarios. The aim was to research whether interacting and communicating with Kaspar would help children with autism interact and communicate more easily with people. This is important because there is mounting evidence that early intervention for children with autism may change the child's development trajectory. Kaspar is a research tool with programmed responses adapted to be used by an autistic child in a safe, non-judgemental environment. The Kaspar research has shown that robots may provide a safe and predictable tool for children with autism, that enables the children to learn social interaction and communication skills, addressing specific therapeutic and educational objectives (for example, being able to engage in direct eye-contact or shared eye-gaze), in an enjoyable play context.

Rocket powered car 
As part of the final year Aerospace Project, students and staffs from the University of Hertfordshire designed, built and tested a full sized rocket powered car under the mentorship of Ray Wilkinson, a senior professor from Department of Aerospace and Mechanical Engineering.With support from BBC - Bang Goes the Theory and Host Dallas Campbell, the Vauxhall VX220 sports car, was fitted with a large hybrid rocket motor that is designed to produce over half a tonne of thrust was tested in the Duxford Aerodrome. The project got lot of attention for its unprecedented success story and was showcased in local places to build interest in STEM.

Facilities 
In 1992, it established University of Hertfordshire Press, whose first publication was a book celebrating the institution's change in status from polytechnic to university.

Art collection 
The University of Hertfordshire holds over 450 artworks in its art collection. The ethos of the UH Art Collection is to present modern and contemporary art in places where people study, work and visit. This reflects the University of Hertfordshire's determination to provide not only an attractive education setting but also one which will inform, enlighten and enhance the life of its students, staff and the local community. The UH Art Collection was established in 1952, as part of Hertfordshire Country Council's commitment to the post-war programme. The collection has a diverse portfolio including photography, textile, ceramics, sculpture, mixed media and works by Ben Nicholson, Barbara Hepworth, Andy Goldsworthy, Alan Davie, and Diane MacLean.

Park and Ride 
Hertfordshire operates a regular shuttle bus service, Park and Ride, which connects 800 parking spaces at Angerland Common with its College Lane and de Havilland Campus facilities. The scheme started in 2006, when it is initially provided with the 700-car facility at Angerland Common, off South Way, Hatfield, in a bid to get cars off surrounding roads.

Since 2006, the university has planned on opening a second venue, with 150 spaces, at the south side car park at Stanborough Lakes in Welwyn Garden City.

Uno bus 

Uno (formerly UniversityBus) is a bus service operated by the University of Hertfordshire, serving members of the general public, and also its own students and staff, at a discounted rate. In 1992, the University of Hertfordshire wanted to create and provide bus service to and from the university. Uno, previously known as UniversityBus, was created to provide student transport to the university from local areas; improve east-west travel across the county of Hertfordshire; and, to create new links between Hertfordshire and North London.

Student life 

The main source of nightlife is the Forum, which houses three entertainment spaces, a restaurant, a café, multiple bars and onsite parking. Hertfordshire Students' Union (HSU) is the Students' Union of the University of Hertfordshire. The Students' Union Social Centre was opened in 1977. The Hatfield Technical College's management encouraged the establishment of a Student Representative Council (SRC) in 1982, to create a sense of unity and expand the social activities of its day students. The SRC was affiliated to the National Union of Students but initially restricted itself largely to social activities. After 1988 it began to campaign on issues such as improvements to the canteen, lifting the ban on religious or political activity within the then Hatfield Polytechnic, and for a formal students' union. The sectarian ban was finally lifted in 1992 and a Union granted in 1995. However, the canteen continued to be an issue throughout the 2000s. The Students' Union at the University of Hertfordshire represents all students in the university by organising campus activities and running different clubs and societies, from sports to entertainment.

Trident Media Radio 
Trident Media Radio (formerly known as Crush Radio, Campus Radio Hatfield, CRUSH and Crush 1278) is the student radio station. TMR is run by students of the university. Crush is run by students of the university along with amateurs from around the surrounding areas.

Crush was the first campus radio, founded in 1960 under the name of CRH (Campus Radio Hatfield). After starting as a pirate radio station, CRH was turned into a University Society of the University of Hertfordshire and was renamed Crush 1278 for it broadcast on 1278AM frequency. As Crush became more accessible, via the internet, the name was changed again to Crush Radio. In 2009 Crush as a society merged with the other media societies of the Students union and the University of Hertfordshire as one media society, though Crush still uses its own website and broadcasts over 1278AM frequency, however it stopped broadcasting on 1278AM after the move in September 2009, but restarted commencing February 2011. Crush Radio has been broadcasting since 1960.  It broadcasts online via the Tunein platform.

Sport

Rowing
The University of Hertfordshire Rowing Club is affiliated to British Rowing (boat code UHE) and Dave Bell became a British champion after winning the men's double sculls title at the 2010 British Rowing Championships.

American Football
The University of Hertfordshire American Football team, The Hurricanes, is affiliated to British Universities American Football League (BUAFL) Premier League South

Partner institutions 
The university holds a number of formal links with top-ranking institutions from around the world to share teaching and research and facilitate staff and student exchanges.
 Chulalongkorn University, Thailand
 James Cook University, Australia
 McGill University, Canada
 Nanyang Technological University, Singapore
 Stony Brook University, US
 University of Oklahoma, US
 Yonsei University, Korea

Aside from its international partners, the university has also strong regional agenda and a number of partner institutions in the region: Elstree Screen Arts Academy a university technical college located in Borehamwood; The Watford UTC, a University Technical College for the Watford area. The UTC specialises in Event Management and Computer Sciences.

Notable alumni 
The university has notable alumni and staff in a number of disciplines. Hertfordshire has more than 5,200 international students and a global network of more than 160,000 alumni.

Arts, science and academia 

Jean Bacon – Professor of Distributed Systems, Computer Laboratory, University of Cambridge
Tony Banham – Founder of the Hong Kong War Diary project
Ciarán O'Keeffe – Psychologist specialising in parapsychology and forensic psychology
Diane Maclean – Sculptor and environmental artist
Ben Mosley - Expressive artist
Sean Hedges-Quinn – British sculptor and animator

Government, politics and society 

Helen Lederer – Comedian, writer and actress who emerged as part of the alternative comedy boom at the beginning of the 1980s
Abdulaziz bin Abdullah – Deputy minister of foreign affairs in Saudi Arabia
John Cryer – English Labour Party politician
Richard Howitt – Member of the European Parliament for the Labour Party for the East of England
Akif Çağatay Kılıç –  Current Minister of Youth and Sports of Turkey
Darell Leiking - Former minister of the international trade & industry of Malaysia (MITI) and current MP in Malaysian Parliament 
Mark Oaten –  British former politician who was a senior member of the Liberal Democrat Party
Fiona Onasanya - Labour Member of Parliament
Lawrie Quinn – Labour politician in England
Claire Ward – British Labour Party politician
Sarah West –  First woman to be appointed to command a major warship in the Royal Navy
Prince Raj – Member of Indian Parliament
Gwen O'Mahony - Former MLA in the 39th Parliament of British Columbia
Onn Hafiz Ghazi - 19th Menteri Besar of Johor in Malaysia

Business and finance 

Chris Gubbey – Auto executive for General Motors
Martin Leach – British businessman
Luke Scheybeler –  British designer and entrepreneur

Media and entertainment 

Kate Bellingham – British engineer and BBC presenter
Yulia Brodskaya – Artist and illustrator known for her handmade elegant and detailed paper illustrations
Sanjeev Bhaskar – British comedian, actor and broadcaster
Matthew Buckley – British actor
Stevyn Colgan – British writer, artist and speaker
Sonia Deol – British radio and television presenter, currently at GlobalBC in Vancouver, Canada (previously BBC Asian Network)
Des de Moor – member of The Irresistible Force with Morris Gould aka Mixmaster Morris both of whom became involved with the emerging UK acid house scene, after organising Madhouse at The Fridge, Brixton in 1988 –; released records on Ninja Tune and made one of the first chillout compilations, Give Peace a Dance 2: The Ambient Collection for the Campaign for Nuclear Disarmament.
Jaine Fenn – British science fiction author
Guvna B – Urban contemporary gospel rap artist and composer
Bob Johnson –  British guitarist formerly in the electric folk band Steeleye Span
 Chris Knowles, anarchist, punk rock musician, drummer,bassist, DJ, member of anarchist collective Hagar the Womb who were affiliated to the Wapping Anarchy Centre, Crass and Poison Girls, and now known as part of the egalitarian industrial techno 'Liberator DJ collective'. He DJs under the moniker Chris Liberator.
Lisa Lazarus –  British model and actress
Helen Lederer, Comedian, writer and actress who emerged as part of the alternative comedy boom at the beginning of the 1980s
Upen Patel – British male model and film actor
Flux Pavilion – British dub step musician (real name Josh Steele)

Sports and athletics 

Ajaz Akhtar – Former British cricketer
Steve Borthwick – Former English rugby union footballer who played lock for Saracens and Bath
Noah Cato – Rugby union player
Iain Dowie – Football manager
Owen Farrell – England, Saracens rugby union player
Gavin Fisher – Former chief designer of the Williams Formula One team.
Alex Goode – Professional British rugby union player
Aaron Liffchak – Rugby union footballer
Michael Owen – Rugby union player: former Wales and British & Irish Lions captain
Sachin Patel – Former British cricketer
Tom Ryder – Rugby union player
Alex Skeel – English football coach, domestic violence survivor

See also
 Armorial of UK universities
 List of universities in the UK
 Post-1992 universities

Notes

References

External links 
 University of Hertfordshire official website

 
Educational institutions established in 1952
1952 establishments in England
University Alliance
Exempt charities
Education in Hertfordshire
Universities UK